Lala Mustafa Pasha's Caucasian campaign was a military expedition launched in 1578 by Lala Mustafa Pasha, a grand-vizier of the expanding Ottoman Empire. It is also considered a part of the larger conflict, Ottoman–Safavid War (1578–90).

History
The main objective of the campaign was to conquer the South Caucasus, most of which, at the time, belonged to or was subject to the Safavid Empire. On August 7, the Ottomans crossed what is nowadays the Georgian border, namely the Samtskhe-Saatabago principality. The Georgians fought fiercely, but political fragmentation rendered them incapable of stopping the Ottoman advance. On August 9, 1578, Turkish armies defeated the coalition of Irano-Georgian forces in the Battle of Çıldır. On August 10, some Samtskhian nobles, including the brother of the ruler, accepted Ottoman vassalage and in so doing, greatly aided them in the conquest of their Principality. The Ottomans continued their expansion against the Safavids, and by the August 24 took the Georgian capital of Tbilisi, the capital of the Kingdom of Kartli as well, which was subordinate to Safavid Iran. The Turks also established territorial units with Ottoman officials in the conquered areas, for example - Beylerbeylik of Tbilisi (Kartli), Sanjak of Gori, Eyalet of Childir, and others. King of Kakheti, Alexander acted wisely and made peace with the Ottomans on September 1, agreeing on the payment of annual tribute. Because of this agreement, the Kingdom of Kakheti managed to escape the war completely unharmed. After this, Lala Mustafa Pasha headed to Shirvan and Dagestan, which he sought to conquer as well from the Safavids. After campaigning in the eastern Caucasus, Mustafa returned to Erzurum by crossing Kartli and Samtskhe. The Georgians started a number of uprisings against their new Ottoman overlords. The Shah of Iran, exploiting the weakness of the Ottomans, released Simon I of Kartli, who earlier fought against Safavid domination, from captivity. The Safavids hoped that Simon would now start a war against the Turks and their expectations came true, ending the short-lived Ottoman domination in the Caucasus and allowing them to install their puppet David XI on the throne of Kartli. 

The campaign, which was part of the greater war that lasted between 1578-1590, was largely successful. For around two decades after the end of the war, most of the regions conquered from the Iranian Safavids in the North and South Caucasus, remained in Ottoman hands.

See also
 Ottoman-Persian Wars
 Treaty of Istanbul (1590)

References

 Georgian Soviet encyclopedia, vol. 7, pg. 211, Tb., 1984.

Wars involving Georgia (country)
Invasions of Georgia (country)
Wars involving the Ottoman Empire
Battles involving Safavid Iran
Conflicts in 1578
16th century in Georgia (country)
1578 in the Ottoman Empire
16th century in Iran